St Joseph's College of Law is a Jesuit law school in Bangalore, in Karnataka, in south-western India. It was founded in 2017. It is part of St. Joseph's Institutions. It is affiliated to Karnataka State Law University, Hubballi, and approved by the Bar Council of India in New Delhi.

Tragic Demise 
The Director of St Joseph College of Law, Rev. Fr. Praveen Hrudayaraj died at a very young age and the institute lost one of their best minds very soon. He was instrumental in shaping the growth of the college.

See also
 List of Jesuit sites

References

St. Joseph’s College of Law, Bangalore

Educational institutions established in 2017
Jesuit universities and colleges in India
Law schools in Karnataka
Colleges in Bangalore
2017 establishments in Karnataka
Christianity in Karnataka